Boom Technology, Inc. (trade name Boom Supersonic) is an American company designing a , 65-88-passenger supersonic airliner. The Boom XB-1 Baby Boom one-third-scale demonstrator first test flight was planned for September 2022 but then delayed until around mid-2023.

After incubation by Y Combinator in 2016, Boom Technology raised $51 million venture capital in 2017, and an additional $100 million by January 2019.

History
The company was founded in Denver in 2014.
It participated in a Y Combinator startup incubation program in early 2016, and has been funded by Y Combinator, Sam Altman, Seraph Group, Eight Partners, and others.

In March 2017, $33 million were invested by several venture funds: Continuity Fund, RRE Ventures, Palm Drive Ventures, 8VC and Caffeinated Capital.
Boom secured $41 million of total financing by April 2017. 
In December 2017, Japan Airlines invested $10 million, raising the company capital to $51 million: enough to build the XB-1 “Baby Boom” demonstrator and complete its testing, and to start early design work on the 55-seat airliner. In January 2019, Boom raised a further $100 million, bringing the total to $151 million, then planning the demonstrator first flight for later in 2019.

In January 2022, the company announced plans to build a  manufacturing facility on a  site at Piedmont Triad International Airport in Greensboro, North Carolina.

Projects

XB-1 Baby Boom

It was rolled out in October 2020.
By 2021, it was expected to be flight tested in 2022 but delays pushed the expected first flight to mid-2023.

Overture airliner

The Overture is a proposed , 65- to 88-passenger supersonic transport with envisaged  of range. 
With 500 viable routes, Boom suggests there could be a market for 1,000 supersonic airliners with business class fares. It had gathered 76 commitments by December 2017. It decided to use the delta wing configuration of Concorde and make use of composite materials. It is to be powered by three  dry turbofan engines. A derivative or a clean-sheet design was to be selected in 2019.

In September 2020, the company announced that it had been contracted to develop the Overture for possible use as Air Force One.
Boom CEO Blake Scholl "estimates that flights on Overture will be available in 2030."

In January 2021, Boom announced plans to begin Overture test flights in 2026. In June 2021, United Airlines announced that it had signed a deal to purchase 15 Boom Overture aircraft, with an option to buy 35 more. They are scheduled to begin operating in 2029.

On August 16, 2022, Boom announced that American Airlines had agreed to purchase 20 Boom Overture aircraft.

Symphony engine

In December 2022, Boom announced the Symphony, a new propulsion system to be designed for the Overture. Boom will work with three companies to develop Symphony: Florida Turbine Technologies for engine design, GE Additive for additive technology design consulting, and StandardAero for maintenance.

See also

References

External links
 

Aircraft manufacturers of the United States
American companies established in 2014
2016 establishments in Colorado
Aerospace companies of the United States
Vehicle manufacturing companies established in 2014